William McKee may refer to:

William McKee (chief executive) (born 1952), chief executive of the Belfast Heath and Social Care Trust
Sir William Cecil McKee, Lord Mayor of Belfast
William J. McKee (1850–1929), Ontario, Canada merchant and politician
William J. McKee (soldier) (1853–?), U.S. Brigadier-general
William F. McKee (1906–1987), general in the U.S. Air Force
William Parker McKee (1862–1933), chief executive of the Frances Shimer Academy, subsequently Shimer College
William McKee (cricketer) (1919–1986), Irish cricketer

See also
William Mackay (disambiguation)
William McKay (disambiguation)
William McKie (disambiguation)